Gorthleck is a small hamlet on the north shore Loch Mhòr in Inverness-shire, Scottish Highlands and is in the Scottish council area of Highland. The Gorthleck hamlet encompasses the village of Lyne of Gorthleck, and Gorthleck House, where it was rumoured that Bonny Prince Charlie stayed after the Battle of Culloden and had to flee after seeing Redcoats appear, from an upstairs window.

References 

Populated places in Inverness committee area